Who's Afraid of Virginia Woolf? is a 1966 American drama film directed by Mike Nichols in his directorial debut. The screenplay by Ernest Lehman is an adaptation of Edward Albee's 1962 play of the same name. It stars Elizabeth Taylor as Martha, Richard Burton as George, George Segal as Nick, and Sandy Dennis as Honey. The film depicts a late-night gathering at the home of George, a college history professor, and his wife Martha, the daughter of the university's president. The guests are Nick, a new biology professor at the school, and his wife, Honey.

The film was nominated for 13 Academy Awards, including Best Picture and Best Director for Mike Nichols. It is one of only two films to be nominated in every eligible category at the Academy Awards (the other is Cimarron). All four main actors were nominated in their respective acting categories, the first time a film's entire credited cast was nominated. The film won five Oscars, including a second Academy Award for Best Actress for Taylor and Best Supporting Actress for Dennis.

In 2013, the film was selected by the Library of Congress for preservation in the United States National Film Registry as "culturally, historically, or aesthetically significant".

Plot
George, an associate professor of history at a small New England college, and his wife Martha, the daughter of the university president, return home drunk from a party. Martha has invited a young married couple she met at the party for a drink. The guests arrive—Nick, a biology professor, and his wife, Honey—just before 2:30 A.M. As the four drink, Martha and George engage in scathing verbal abuse in front of Nick and Honey. The younger couple is first embarrassed and later entangled.

Martha angers George by telling Honey about their son, who will celebrate his 16th birthday the next day. Martha's divulging of this information sets off another fight between the two. Nick confesses to George that he was attracted to Honey for her family's money and married her only because he mistakenly believed she was pregnant. George describes his own marriage as one of never-ending accommodation and adjustment, then admits he considers Nick a threat. George also tells a story about a boy he grew up with who had accidentally killed his mother and, years later, his father and lived out his days in a mental hospital. Nick admits he aims to charm and sleep his way to the top and jokes that Martha would be a good place to start.

When their guests propose leaving, a drunken George insists on driving them home. They approach a roadhouse, and Honey suggests they stop to dance. While Honey and George watch, Nick suggestively dances with Martha, who continues to mock and criticize George. George unplugs the jukebox and announces the game is over. In response, Martha alludes to the fact he may have murdered his parents like the protagonist in his unpublished novel, prompting George to attack Martha until Nick pulls him away from her. George tells the group about a second novel he has written about a teacher and his wife who marry because of her false pregnancy and family money. Honey realizes Nick told George about their past and runs from the room.

Another argument leads Martha to drive off with Nick and Honey, leaving George to make his way back home on foot, where he sees the shadows of Martha and Nick in the bedroom. Through Honey's drunken babbling, George begins to suspect that her pregnancy was in fact real and that she secretly had an abortion. He then devises a plan to get back at Martha.

When Martha accuses Nick of being sexually inadequate, he blames his performance on the liquor he has consumed. Martha and George argue about their son and George announces he has received a telegram saying their son has been killed in a car accident.

As Martha begs George not to "kill" their son, Nick realizes the truth: Martha and George had never been able to have children and filled the void with an imaginary son. George explains that their one mutually agreed upon rule was to never mention the son to anyone else, and that he "killed" him because Martha broke that rule by mentioning him to Honey.

The young couple departs quietly, and George and Martha are left alone as the day begins to break outside. George starts singing the song "Who's Afraid of Virginia Woolf?", and Martha responds, "I am, George, I am", while the two hold hands.

Cast
 Elizabeth Taylor as Martha
 Richard Burton as George
 George Segal as Nick
 Sandy Dennis as Honey
 Agnes Flanagan as roadhouse waitress (uncredited)
 Frank Flanagan as roadhouse manager (uncredited)

Production

Development
Edward Albee's 1962 play was replete with dialogue that violated the standard moral guidelines for movies at the time, including multiple instances of "goddamn" and "son of a bitch", along with "screw you", "up yours", "monkey nipples" and "hump the hostess". It opened on Broadway during the Cuban Missile Crisis, and audiences who had gone to the theater to forget the threat of nuclear war were shocked by the provocative language and situations they had not seen before outside of experimental theater.

The immediate reaction of the theater audiences, eventually voiced by critics, was that Albee had created a play that would be a great success on Broadway, but could never be filmed in its current form. Neither the audience nor the critics understood how much the Hollywood landscape was changing in the 1960s, and that it could no longer live with any meaningful Production Code. In bringing the play to the screen, Ernest Lehman decided he would not change the dialogue that had shocked veteran theatergoers in New York only four years earlier. Despite serious opposition to this decision, Lehman prevailed.

Casting
The choice of Elizabeth Taylor—at the time regarded as one of the most beautiful women in the world—to play the frumpy, fifty-ish Martha surprised many, but the actress gained  for the role. When Warner Bros. head Jack L. Warner approached Albee about buying the film rights for the play, he told Albee that he wanted to cast Bette Davis and James Mason in the roles of Martha and George. In the script, Martha references Davis and quotes her famous "What a dump!" line from the film Beyond the Forest (1949). Albee was delighted by this cast, believing that "James Mason seemed absolutely right...and to watch Bette Davis do that Bette Davis imitation in that first scene—that would have been so wonderful". However, fearing that the talky, character-driven story would land with a resounding thud—and that audiences would grow weary of watching two hours of screaming between a harridan and a wimp—Nichols and Lehman cast stars Elizabeth Taylor and Richard Burton. Edward Albee was surprised by the casting decision, but later stated that Taylor was quite good and Burton was incredible. In the end, though, he still felt that "with Mason and Davis you would have had a less flashy and ultimately deeper film".

Filming
As filming began, the Catholic Legion of Motion Pictures (formerly the Catholic Legion of Decency), issued a preliminary report that, if what they heard was true, they might have to issue Virginia Woolf with the once-dreaded "condemned" rating, although they promised to wait to see the film. The Motion Picture Association of America (MPAA) followed with an even stronger statement, warning the studio—without promising to wait for a screening—that if they were really thinking of leaving the Broadway play's language intact, they could forget about getting a seal of approval.

Most of the film's exteriors were shot on location at Smith College, Northampton, Massachusetts. Nichols insisted on this for verisimilitude, but later stated that he had been misguided, that it added nothing artistically, and that these scenes could as well have been shot on any sound stage.

Music
The film's music is an original score by Alex North. At the time of the film's release, Warner Bros. Records released a gatefold two-LP record soundtrack album set that included the entire film's dialogue as the "Deluxe Edition Two-Record Set". The music was issued as a one-LP release that featured 11 tracks of North's score.

Differences from the play
The film adaptation differs slightly from the play, which has only four characters. The minor characters of the roadhouse owner, who has only a few lines of dialogue, and his wife, who serves a tray of drinks and leaves silently, were played by the film's gaffer, Frank Flanagan, and his wife, Agnes.

The play is set entirely in Martha and George's house. In the film, one scene takes place at the roadhouse, one in George and Martha's yard, and one in their car. Despite these minor deviations, however, the film is extremely faithful to the play. The filmmakers used the original play as the screenplay and, aside from toning down some of the profanity slightly—Martha's "Screw you!" (which, in the 2005 Broadway revival, is "Fuck you!") becomes "God damn you!"—virtually all of the original dialogue remains intact, although a major monologue by Martha is cut. (In the version released in the UK, "Screw you" is kept intact. In an interview at the time of the release, Taylor referred to this phrase as pushing boundaries.)

Nick is never referred to or addressed by name during the film or the play.

Distribution
Warner Bros. studio executives sat down to look at a rough cut, without music, and a Life magazine reporter was present. He printed the following quote from one of the studio chiefs: "My God! We've got a seven million dollar dirty movie on our hands!"

The film was considered groundbreaking for having a level of profanity and sexual implication unheard of at that time. Jack Valenti, who had just become president of the MPAA in 1966, had arranged to update the old Production Code. For the film to be released with MPAA approval, Warner Bros. agreed to deletions of certain profanities and to have a special warning placed on all advertisements for the film, indicating adult content. In addition, all contracts with theatres exhibiting the film included a clause to prohibit anyone under 18 from admittance without adult supervision. Even the National Catholic Office for Motion Pictures (NCOMP) refused to "condemn" the film, with the office ruling it "morally unobjectionable for adults, with reservations". This film and Michelangelo Antonioni's Blow-Up (1966) led Valenti to begin work on the MPAA film rating system that went into effect on November 1, 1968. It is also said that Jack L. Warner chose to pay a fine of $5,000 in order to remain as faithful to the play (and its profanity) as possible.

Theatrical release
Who's Afraid of Virginia Woolf? premiered on June 21, 1966, at the Pantages Theatre in Hollywood. The film went on to become a financial success, earning a North American rental gross of $14.5 million, which made it the third-highest-grossing film of 1966.

Home media
The film was first released on DVD in North America on October 1, 1997. It has since been re-released in a two-disc special edition that was concurrently released across North America and much of Europe. To coincide the film's 50th anniversary, Warner Archive Collection released a manufacture-on-demand Blu-ray on May 3, 2016, that was sold exclusively to online retailers.

Critical reception

Arthur D. Murphy of Variety wrote the film was a "[k]een adaptation and handsome production by Ernest Lehman, outstanding direction by Mike Nichols in his feature debut, and four topflight performances score an artistic bullseye." He praised Taylor's performance, writing that her "characterization is at once sensual, spiteful, cynical, pitiable, loathsome, lustful and tender." James Powers of The Hollywood Reporter wrote the film "is an instant film classic, and Warner Bros. deserves the highest credit for making it a movie without compromise." Powers wrote that Taylor "reaches the fullest of her powers as Martha. The actress' beauty and the richness of her personal life have repeatedly obscured the fact that she can be, when she cares to be, an actress of extraordinary power... Miss Taylor is a prime reason the film seems so very seldom a drama, and almost always a violation of privacy, captured with hidden cameras and microphones." Kate Cameron of the New York Daily News wrote Taylor gave "the outstanding acting role of her career" and was "nothing less than brilliant" as Martha.

Stanley Kauffmann of The New York Times praised Nichols's direction, writing he had "minimized the 'stage' feeling, and he has given the film an insistent presence, good phrasing and a nervous drive. It sags toward the end, but this is because the third act of the play sags." Of Burton's performance, Kauffmann noted he was "utterly convincing as a man with a great lake of nausea in him, on which he sails with regret and compulsive amusement"; he also praised Taylor for delivering "the best work of her career". A review in Time magazine noted Nichols "does more to enrich Virginia Woolf emotionally. Beneath the surface battles of this love-hate saga, he subtly works in evidence of the rough affection between George and Martha, their easy habits of togetherness and mellowed private jokes; and the characters develop more recognizable human frailty than they ever showed on stage."

In his review for The New York Times, Bosley Crowther wrote, "Miss Taylor and Mr. Burton are splendid, providing quite as much as the play permits of sharp psychological dissection of the older, corrosive pair. Perhaps Mr. Nichols's direction allows them to punch too hard at times." He also expressed disappointment that Nichols "was not able to get more from the roles of the other couple, whom George Segal and Sandy Dennis play." Andrew Sarris of The Village Voice felt the "movie isn't all that good, but it's reasonably entertaining and effective within certain limitations, some evitable and some inevitable. Why Jack Warner should be applauded for bringing a Broadway hit to the screen is a bit beyond me."

On the review aggregator website Rotten Tomatoes, the film has an approval rating of 96% based on 45 reviews, with an average rating of 8.50/10. The website's critical consensus reads, "Led by a volcanic performance from Elizabeth Taylor, Who's Afraid of Virginia Woolf? is a scathing adaptation of the Edward Albee play that serves as a brilliant calling card for debuting director Mike Nichols." At Metacritic, which assigns a weighted mean rating to reviews, the film has a score of 75 based on 11 critics, indicating "generally favorable reviews".

The Japanese filmmaker Akira Kurosawa cited this movie as one of his 100 favorite films.

Accolades
The film is one of only two films (the other is Cimarron) to be nominated in every eligible category at the Academy Awards. Each of the four actors was nominated for an Oscar but only Elizabeth Taylor and Sandy Dennis won, respectively for Best Actress and Supporting Actress. The film also won the Black and White Cinematography award for Haskell Wexler's stark, black-and-white camera work (it was the last film to win before the two cinematography categories were combined into one), Best Costume Design and for Best Art Direction (Richard Sylbert, George James Hopkins). It was the first film to have its entire credited cast be nominated for acting Oscars, a feat only accomplished two other times, with Sleuth in 1972 and Give 'em Hell, Harry! in 1975.

In AFI's 100 Years... 100 Movies (10th Anniversary Edition), Who's Afraid of Virginia Woolf? ranked  67.

In 2013, the film was selected for preservation in the United States National Film Registry by the Library of Congress as being "culturally, historically, or aesthetically significant".

Paul Mavis of DVD Talk, reviewing Warner Bros.'s 2006 Elizabeth Taylor and Richard Burton: The Film Collection disc release of Who's Afraid of Virginia Woolf?, wrote, "Who's Afraid of Virginia Woolf? exists now as one of the seminal dramas of the modern screen. And its existence counterbalances every gauche public display the Burtons perpetrated, every ream of wasted newsprint devoted to their sometimes silly, outsized lives, and every mediocre film they made before and after its production. It is the peak of their collective and individual careers. And they would never recover from it."

See also
 List of American films of 1966
 List of films with all four Academy Award acting nominations

Notes

References

Bibliography

External links
 
 
 
 
 

1966 films
1966 directorial debut films
1966 drama films
1960s American films
1960s English-language films
American black-and-white films
American drama films
American films based on plays
Best Film BAFTA Award winners
Films about adultery in the United States
Films about alcoholism
Films about dysfunctional families
Films about educators
Films about mental health
Films directed by Mike Nichols
Films featuring a Best Actress Academy Award-winning performance
Films featuring a Best Supporting Actress Academy Award-winning performance
Films produced by Ernest Lehman
Films scored by Alex North
Films shot in Massachusetts
Films that won the Best Costume Design Academy Award
Films whose art director won the Best Art Direction Academy Award
Films whose cinematographer won the Best Cinematography Academy Award
Films with screenplays by Ernest Lehman
United States National Film Registry films